Tommy Denander (born March 10, 1968, in Stockholm, Sweden) is a Swedish guitarist, songwriter and record producer. He is mostly famous for his role in the AOR project Radioactive, signed to Frontiers Records.

The new Radioactive album called X.X.X in 2022 features guests like Robin McAuley, Robbie LaBlanc, Jerome Mazza, Clif Magness, Mutt Lange and Andreas Carlsson.

Denander has worked with artists including Michael Jackson, Paul Stanley, Alice Cooper (including original members Neal Smith, Dennis Dunaway, Michael Bruce, plus Steve Hunter and Dick Wagner), Deep Purple, Anastacia, Ricky Martin, Hollywood Vampires, Rob Thomas, Jeff Beck, Peter Cetera, Richard Marx, Rob Zombie, Vince Gill, Ke$ha, Steve Perry and many more. Producers include Robert "Mutt" Lange, David Foster, Max Martin, Bob Ezrin, Desmond Child, Humberto Gatica, Bob Clearmountain, Denniz Pop, and Chris Lord Alge.

He is the founder of Legends Of Rock, a project that featured rock singers including Bobby Kimball, Jimi Jamison, Joe Lynn Turner, Tony Martin, Graham Bonnet, Mickey Thomas, Fergie Frederiksen, Steve Augeri, and Eric Martin.

His signature VGS guitar features both the Evertune bridge and True Temperament frets.

Together with Bob Ezrin and Tommy Henriksen, he co-produced and co-wrote Alice Cooper's album, Paranormal, that was released on July 28, 2017. Denander played most of the guitars on the album. Denander also worked on Alice Cooper's Detroit Stories as co-writer, co-producer and musician.

He co-wrote and played on the song "Welcome To Bushwackers", that featured Jeff Beck on lead guitar, plus Denander played on the song "Mr Spider" on the Hollywood Vampires album, Rise.

Discography

The purpose of this discography is to list as many of Denander's sessions as possible and to try and find all different versions also.

As solo artist 
1995: Less Is More
2020: Less Is More "remaster"
1995: Skeleton
2020: Skeleton "remaster"
1995: Less Is More & Skeleton (Compilation)
Less Is More "Asia"
2007: Limited Access
2007: Guitar Czar
2009: Guitar Clinic Tour CD
Line6 Demo CD
Swedish Hardrock & Heavy metal 70 - 96
TOTO XX Part Duex - Bootleg
Studio Sessions - Bootleg
Mad About You - Bootleg
Burnin' - Bootleg
Frontiers Magazine Compilation 3
Great Guitars - Compilation - Romania
Beverly compilation Germany
2015: From The Vault Vol 1
2015: From The Vault Vol 2
2015: From The Vault Vol 3
2015: From The Vault Vol 4
2015: From The Vault Vol 5
2015: From The Vault Vol 6
2015: From The Vault Vol 7
2015: From The Vault Vol 8
2015: From The Vault Vol 9
2015: From The Vault Vol 10
Hollie-Day Picks
2019: Silent Night (Single)
2018: Dreamland (Single)
2017: Heartstrings (Single)
2018: Tommy Denander feat. Hollie Fronda - Twinkle, Twinkle Little Star (Single)

Selected top work 
Paul Stanley - Live To Win
Alice Cooper - Welcome 2 My Nightmare
Alice Cooper - Paranormal
Alice Cooper - A Paranormal Evening Live In Paris
Alice Cooper - Detroit Stories
Deep Purple - Infinite
Hollywood Vampires - Rise
Ricky Martin - MAS
Anastacia - Evolution
Umberto Tozzi & Anastacia - Ti Amo
Pat Boone - Legacy
Steve Walsh - Black Butterfly
David Archuleta - s/t
Big Time Rush - BTR
Tokio Hotel - Alice In Wonderland Movie Soundtrack
Glee - The Graduation Album
Tina Arena - Eleven
Björn Skifs - Da Capo
Jill Johnson - Being Who I Am

with ATC
1983: Soundtracks Compilation
1984: Cut In Ice
1984: Cut In Ice - Cassette Version
Swe HR & HM 1970 - 96
Sweden Rocks the 80's "bootleg" Japan
Live at Gröna Lund 1985 "bootleg"
2007: Cut In Ice - Reissue CD Version Brazil

with Bruce Gaitsch
1999: Denander - Gaitsch - Counterparts

with Fergie Frederiksen
2007: Frederiksen -Denander - Baptism By Fire
2007: Frederiksen -Denander - Baptism By Fire - Promo Version
2007: Frederiksen -Denander - Baptism By Fire - Russian Version
2007: Frederiksen -Denander - Baptism By Fire - Japanese Version
2007: Hear It - Vol 31 - Compilation
2007: Let The Hammer Fall Vol. 61 -Compilation

with Radioactive
Encyclopedia of Swedish Hard rock & Heavy metal
Ceremony Of Innocence "promo pack"
2001: Ceremony Of Innocence
Ceremony Of Innocence +1 "print error 1"
Ceremony Of Innocence +1 "print error 2"
Ceremony Of Innocence +1 "Japan"
MTM Volume 5
MTM Volume 6
MTM Volume 7
MTM Volume 8
MTM Volume 9
MTM Volume 10
MTM Rock Ballads - Charity for USA
MTM Rock Ballads - Vol 4
MTM Rock Ballads - Vol 6
United Compilation
2003: YEAH
YEAH Promo Carboard Sleeve Version
YEAH +1 - Japan
YEAH Russian Version
Demos 1991 - 2001 - “Bootleg”
The Making Of Radioactive - “Bootleg”
2005: Taken
Taken - Promo Carboard Sleeve Version
Taken Russian Version
Taken - ltd Edition + DVD
Taken + 1 - "Japan"
Legacy 3 CD Box (Compilation)
2015: F4ur
F4ur Russian Version
F4ur + 1 "Japan"
Fireworks issue 70
Play Station 08-06 Russian Magazine Compilation
Melodicrock.com V3 Compilation
2022: X.X.X
X.X.X - Japan

with Impera
2012: Legacy Of Life
Legacy Of Life +1 Japan
2013: Pieces Of Eden
Pieces Of Eden +1 Japan
Pieces Of Eden - Russian Version
2015: Empire Of Sin
Empire Of Sin +1 Japan
Shadows In Light - SRM Single
Heart It - Vol 77 - Compilation
Let's Get Rocked - Vol 20
Let's Get Rocked - Vol 33
Let's Get Rocked - Vol 49
Let's Get Rocked - Vol 50

with Prisoner
2000: Blind
Blind +1 "Japan"
2020: Blind "remaster"
2001: II +3 "Ltd Edition"
2001: II "Promo"
2020: II "remaster"
Cruzade compilation
MHR compilation
Sacred Groove Compilation
Musically Correct 4
Musically Correct 5
Melodicrock mp3 album
Rock The Nations Compilation
Live At Z Rock 2001 - “Bootleg”

with Rainmaker
Rainmaker (s/t)
2019: Rainmaker (s/t) - Remaster
Sacred Groove Compilation
Sacred Groove 2 Compilation
Melodicrock MP3 album
Classic Rock Compilation
Musically Correct 4
Musically Correct 5
Rock The Nations
Rock The Nations II

with Lion's Share
Compilation Belgium
1994: Lion's Share (s/t)
Lion's Share (s/t) - Japan
Lions Share (s/t) - Germany
1997: TWO
TWO - Japan
2000: Perspective (Compilation)
Entrance "promo pack"
Entrance "Scandinavia"
Entrance "Europe"
Entrance "South America"
Entrance "Russia"
Rock Hard Compilation
Metal Hammer Compilation
Metal Maniacs Compilation
Nightmare Compilation
United

with Talk Of The Town
1988: Talk Of The Town (s/t)
1988: Talk Of The Town (s/t) "Germany"
1st - 2nd + Vikström
1998: Reach For The Sky
2000: The Ways Of The World
2000: The Ways Of The World  - Japanese Version

with Speedy Gonzales
2006: Speedy Gonzales - Electric Stalker
2005: Speedy Gonzales - Electric Stalker - Japanese Version
2020: Speedy Gonzales - Electric Stalker - "remaster"
2005: Listen Up - Compilation - 2005
Sweden Rock Magazine - Compilation- 2005
Hear It - Vol 23 - Compilation - 2005

with Deacon Street Project
2004: Deacon Street Project (s/t) - Promo Version
2004: Deacon Street Project (s/t)
2020: Deacon Street Project (s/t) - "remaster"
2006: Deacon Street Project II - Promo Version
2006 Deacon Street Project II
2020: Deacon Street Project II - "remaster"
2004: Hear It - Vol 13 - Compilation

with Spin Gallery
2004: Standing Tall
2004: Standing Tall - Japanese Version
2009: Embrace
2009: Embrace - Japanese Version
Scandinavian Strings - Attached
2004: Hear It - Vol 14 - Compilation

with Talisman
Genesis Reissue
Vaults - Deluxe Edition
Lost Gemms "Bootleg"

with House Of Lords
2008: Come To My Kingdom
2008: Come To My Kingdom - Japanese Version
2009: Cartesian Dreams
2009: Cartesian Dreams - Japanese Version
2011: Big Money
2011: Big Money - Japanese Version
2015: Indestructible
2015: Indestructible - Japanese Version
2017: Saint Of The Lost Souls
2017: Saint Of The Lost Souls - Japanese Version
2020: New World
2020: New World - Japanese Version
2020: New World - Russian Version
Classic Rock Magazine - AOR Special Compilation
Let's Get Rocked - Compilation
Let's Get Rocked - Vol 11
Rockhard - Le Sampler - Vol 114

with Robin Beck
2007: Living On A Dream
2009: Trouble Or Nothing 20th Anniversary Edition
2011: The Great Escape
2011: The Great Escape - US Version
2011: The Great Escape - Japanese Version
2011: The Great Escape - Russian Version
2013: Underneath
2013: Underneath - Japanese Version
2013: Underneath - Russian Version
2011: Believe In Me, The Finest Rock Ballads
2013: Melodic Rock - Compilation
2013: Fireworks Magazine
2014: Live At Sweden Rock Festival (Bootleg)
Wild at heart - The return of metal ballads
Classic Rock Magazine Presents AOR
Let's Get Rocked - Vol 8
2017: Love Is Coming
Love Is Coming - Japanese Version
Metal Hard Rock Box - 4 CD Compilation
KuschelRock 25 - Das Jubiläumsalbum - 3 CD Compilation

with AOR
2002: L.A. Reflection
L.A. Reflection - Japanese Version
2003: Dreaming Of L.A.
Dreaming Of L.A. - Promo
Dreaming Of L.A. - Japanese Version
Dreaming of L.A. - Re release with 6 bonus tracks
2004: Nothing But The Best (Compilation)
Nothing But The Best (Compilation) - Japanese Version
2000: L.A. Concession
L.A. Concession - Japanese Version
2009: Journey To L.A.
Journey To L.A. - Russian Version
2010: L.A. Ambition (Compilation)
LA Reflection (Compilation) - Re release with 4 bonus tracks
2006: L.A Attraction
L.A Attraction - Japanese Version
L.A Attraction - Russian Version
L.A Concession Re release with 4 bonus tracks
2012: The Colors Of L.A
The Colors Of L.A - Russian Version
2012: L.A Temptation
LA Temptation - Russian Version
2013: The Secrets Of L.A
The Secrets Of L.A - Japanese Version
The Secrets Of L.A - Russian Version
2014: L.A Connection
L.A Connection - Japanese Version
AOR - The Best Of Dane Donohue
AOR - Unreleased Tracks
2016: LA Darkness
AOR - The Heart Of L.A
2015: Return To L.A
2018: More Demos from L.A
2019: Heavenly Demos
2021: The Ghost Of L.A.
Hear It - Vol 10 - Compilation
Let's Get Rocked - Vol 5
Let's Get Rocked - Vol 14
Let's Get Rocked - Vol 15
Let's Get Rocked - Vol 22
Let's Get Rocked - Vol 31
Let's Get Rocked - Vol 34
Let's Get Rocked - Vol 42
Let's Get Rocked - Vol 43

with Phenomena
2010: Blind Faith
Blind Faith + 1 Japan
Blind Faith - Russian Version
Blind Faith - Vinyl Version
2012: Awakening
Awakening + 1 Japan
Awakening - Russian Version
Classic Rock Magazine - AOR Special Compilation

with Houston
Houston (s/t)
Houston (s/t) UK Promo Version
Houston (s/t) "UK version with 2 bonus tracks"
II
II Russian Version
Relaunch
Don't You Know What Love Is (Single)
Runaway (Single)
I'm Coming Home (Single)
Fireworks Magazine - Vol 40 Compilation

with Silver
2001: Intruder
Intruder Promo Version
Intruder Russian Version
Intruder +1 Japan
2004: Addiction
Addiction Promo Version
Addiction Russian Version
Addiction +1 Japan
2005: Gold
Gold Promo Version
Gold Russian Version
Gold +1 Japan
2014: Idolized The Very Best Of

Various Artist compilations
Melodifestivalen 2003 - 2003 (3× PLATINUM)
Melodifestivalen 2009 - 2009 (4× PLATINUM)
Melodifestivalen 2010 - 2010 (5× PLATINUM)
Melodifestivalen 2011 - 2011 (5× PLATINUM)
Melodifestivalen 2012 - 2012 (4× PLATINUM)
Melodifestivalen 2013 - 2013 (4× PLATINUM)
Melodifestivalen 2014 - 2014 (2× PLATINUM)
Melodifestivalen 2015 - 2015 (PLATINUM)
Melodifestivalen 2016 - 2016 (PLATINUM)
Melodi Grand Prix (Norway) - 2004
Mr Music - Hits 8 - 2004
Melodi Grand Prix (Norway) - 2005
Eirodziesma 2006 (Estonia) - 2006
Lugna Favoriter - 2009
Rix FM - Festival - 2009 (GOLD)
Rix FM - Bäst Musik Just Nu - 2010 (GOLD)
Body Work - Summer Edition - 2010
Dance Anthems - 2 - 2010
Absolute Kidz 26 - 2009 (GOLD)
Absolute Music 15 (GOLD & PLATINUM)
Absolute Music 60 - 2009 (GOLD & PLATINUM)
Absolute Music 63 - 2010 (GOLD)
Absolute Music 78 - 2015
Absolute Music 80 - 2016
Absolute Summer Hits - 2009
Absolute Dance anthems (GOLD & PLATINUM)
Absolute Party Anthems (GOLD)
Playground Music Hitit - 2015
Melodicrock.com - Vol 1 Revealed & Revisited -  2003
Melodicrock.com - Vol 2 The Beast Inside - 2005
Melodicrock.com - Vol 3 V3 - 2006
Melodicrock.com - 10 Year Anniversary - 2007
Melodicrock.com - We Wil Rock Yule - 2009
Melodicrock.com - Forces Of Dark & Light - 2010
MRCD9 - 15 Years Later
Let The Hammer Fall Vol. 61 -Compilation - 2007
Frontiers - Rock The Bones Vol 3 - 2005
Frontiers - Rock The Bones Vol 5 - Promo - 2007
Frontiers - Rock The Bones Vol 5 - 2007
Frontiers - Rock Ballads - 2010
Fireworks - Compilation 34 - 2008
Fireworks - Compilation 40 - 2010
Fireworks - Compilation 42 - 2011
Fireworks - Compilation 44 - 2011
Fireworks - Compilation 70 - 2015
Classic Rock Magazine - AOR Issue 1 - 2011
Classic Rock Magazine - AOR Issue 3 - 2011
Classic Rock - Aormania - 2011
Classic Rock Magazine - AOR Supersonic- 2013
Rocks Magazine "Germany" - 2011
Hear It - Vol 7 - 2004
Hear It - Vol 10 - 2004
Hear It - Vol 11 - 2004
Hear It - Vol 13 - 2004
Hear It - Vol 14 - 2004
Hear It - Vol 18 - 2005
Hear It - Vol 21 - 2005
Hear It - Vol 23 - 2005
Hear It - Vol 31 - 2007
Hear It - Vol 37 - 2008
Hear It - Vol 55 - 2011
Hear It - Vol 77 - 2015
Hear It - Vol 91 - 2017
Let's Get Rocked - Melodic Rock & Metal Compilation
Let's Get Rocked - Vol 5
Let's Get Rocked - Vol 6
Let's Get Rocked - Vol 7
Let's Get Rocked - Vol  8
Let's Get Rocked - Vol 10
Let's Get Rocked - Vol 11
Let's Get Rocked - Vol 12
Let's Get Rocked - Vol 14
Let's Get Rocked - Vol 15
Let's Get Rocked - Vol 19
Let's Get Rocked - Vol 20
Let's Get Rocked - Vol 22
Let's Get Rocked - Vol 30
Let's Get Rocked - Vol 31
Let's Get Rocked - Vol 33
Let's Get Rocked - Vol 34
Let's Get Rocked - Vol 42
Let's Get Rocked - Vol 43
Let's Get Rocked - Vol 49
Let's Get Rocked - Vol 50
Westcoast Radio Hits - Rock - 1996
Fame Factory - Vol 6  - 2003
Fame Factory - Vol 7  - 2004
Fame Factory - Vol 8  - 2004
Dansband Collection - 2 - 2004
Poppärlor - 5 - 2005
Danspärlor - 3 - 2006
Danspärlor - 4 - 2006
UMe - 4th Quarter Sports Sampler - 2008
Rockhard 114 (House Of Lords) - 2011
RockHard 178 (Alice Cooper) - 2017
Classic Rock Magazine - Best Of The Year - 2017
Metal Hard Rock Box - 2018
Believe In Me, The Finest Rock Ballads - 2011
Absolute Svensk Pop - 2016
Absolut Jul - 2014
The 10's - 2016
Made In Sweden- 2016
Absolute 10's - 2016
Mello - 2016
Radio Hits 10's - 2016
Svensk Musik 10-tal - 2016
Mello - 100 Låtar - 2016
2010's - 2016
Svenska 10-talsfavoriter - 2016
Svenskt 10-tal - 2016
Swedish Pop Diamonds - 2016
All 10's - 2016

Various Artist Tribute Albums
Undressed - Kiss Tribute - 2003
A Tribute To Boston - 2003
A Tribute To Boston - 2003 - Japanese Version
Jason Becker - Warmth In The Wilderness 
Jason Becker - Warmth In The Wilderness "Japan" 
Jason Becker - Warmth In The Wilderness II 
Jason Becker - Warmth In The Wilderness II "Japan"
Sweet Fa - Tribute - 2004
The Sweet According To Sweden - 2004
The Sweet According To Sweden - Russian Version - 2004
Jimi Hendrix Tribute - The Spirit Lives On II - 2005
Jimi Hendrix Tribute - The Spirit Lives On II - Russian Version - 2005
KISS Tribute - A World With Heroes: A Tribute For Cancer - 2013
KISS Tribute - A World With Heroes: A Tribute For Cancer - 2013 - iTunes Version

Bootlegs
Legends Of Rock - Voices Of Rock Live In Tokyo (first night)  (Bobby Kimball, Fergie Frederiksen, Bill Champlin, Steve Augeri)
Legends Of Rock - Voices Of Rock Live In Tokyo (second night)  (Bobby Kimball, Fergie Frederiksen, Bill Champlin, Steve Augeri)
Legends Of Rock - Voices Of Rock Live In Osaka 1  (Bobby Kimball, Fergie Frederiksen, Bill Champlin, Steve Augeri)
Legends Of Rock - Voices Of Rock Live In Osaka 2 (Bobby Kimball, Fergie Frederiksen, Bill Champlin, Steve Augeri)
Legends Of Rock - Voices Of Rock Live In Osaka 3 (Bobby Kimball, Fergie Frederiksen, Bill Champlin, Steve Augeri)
Horny Strings - Live In Mora (T Denander, Marcel Jacob, Thomas Vikström, Jake Samuel)
Horny Strings - Live at Underground (T Denander, Marcel Jacob, Thomas Vikström, Jake Samuel)
Horny Strings - Live in Eskilstuna (T Denander, Marcel Jacob, Thomas Vikström, Jake Samuel)
Horny Strings - Live at Folkoperan (T Denander, Marcel Jacob, Thomas Vikström, Jake Samuel)
Horny Strings - Live In Stockholm (T Denander, Marcel Jacob, Thomas Vikström, Jake Samuel)
ATC - Live at Gröna Lund
Bobby Kimball - First Time Live (Finland)
Bobby Kimball - Live in Santiago
Bobby Kimball - Live In Lima
Bobby Kimball - Live in Stockholm
Bobby Kimball - Alive In Anaheim
Bobby Kimball - Live At Whiskey A Go Go
Jimi Jamison - Live at Firefest (2nd time)
Robin Beck - Live at Sweden Rock Festival
Robin Beck - Live in Switzerland
Alice Cooper - Russian Compilation (Bootleg)
Alice Cooper - Live In Stockholm 2017 (1)
Alice Cooper - Live In Stockholm 2017 (2)
Alice Cooper - Live In Gothenburg 2017
Alice Cooper - Live at Wacken 2017
Alice Cooper - Live in Mansfield 2017  
Alice Cooper - Live at Jahrhunderthalle, Frankfurt Germany 2017
Alice Cooper - Live at Arena Birmingham, England 2017
Alice Cooper - Live at TSB Bank Arena, Wellington New Zealand 2017
Alice Cooper - Live at Hordern Pavilion, Sydney Australia 2017
Alice Cooper - Deinze, Belgium - 2017
Alice Cooper - Vienna, Austria - 2017
Alice Cooper - Ludwigsburg, Germany - 2017
Alice Cooper - Krefeld, Germany - 2017
Alice Cooper - Maryland Heights, MO, USA - 2017
Alice Cooper - Dallas, TN, USA - 2017
Alice Cooper - Ovens Auditorium, Charlotte, NC, USA - 2018
Alice Cooper - Palace Theatre, Albany, NY, USA - 2018
Alice Cooper - Beacon Theatre, New York, NY, USA - "2018
Alice Cooper - Greek Theatre, Los Angeles, CA, USA - 2018
Alice Cooper - Wang Theatre, Boston, MA, USA - 2018
Alice Cooper - Englewood, NJ, USA - 2018
Alice Cooper - Old National Events Plaza, Evansville - 2019
Alice Cooper - Boulogne-Billancourt, France - 2019
Alice Cooper - Partille Arena, Partille, Sweden - 2019
Alice Cooper - Arkea Arena, Floirac, France - 2019
Alice Cooper - PPL Center, Allentown, PA, USA - 2019
Alice Cooper - Indianapolis, IN, USA - 2019
Alice Cooper - Mannheim, Germany - 2019
Alice Cooper - Cedar Park, TX, USA - 2019
Alice Cooper /Halestorm - Bethel, New York, USA - 2019
Hollywood Vampires - Live At Gröna Lund 2018

Gold & Platinum Awards 
Ricky Martin - MAS "USA version" (GOLD & PLATINUM)
Ricky Martin - MAS "Target version" (GOLD & PLATINUM)
Ricky Martin - MAS "Brazil version" (GOLD & PLATINUM)
Ricky Martin - MAS "Argentina version" (GOLD & PLATINUM)
Ricky Martin - MAS "Chile version" (GOLD, PLATINUM & DIAMOND)
Ricky Martin - MAS "Colombia version" (GOLD & 2× PLATINUM)
Ricky Martin - MAS "Mexico version" (GOLD & PLATINUM)
Ricky Martin - MAS "Venezuela version" (GOLD & PLATINUM)
Ricky Martin - MAS "Digital Version" (GOLD & PLATINUM)
Ricky Martin - MAS (Single Mexico) (GOLD)
Ricky Martin - MAS (Single Digital) (GOLD & 3× PLATINUM)
Ricky Martin - Greatest Hits Souvenir Edition (GOLD)
Big Time Rush - BTR "US Version" (GOLD & PLATINUM)
Big Time Rush - BTR "Digital Version" (GOLD & 7× PLATINUM)
Big Time Rush - BTR "International version" (GOLD & PLATINUM)
Big Time Rush - BTR "Greece" (GOLD & 5× PLATINUM)
Big Time Rush - BTR "Mexico" (GOLD & PLATINUM)
Big Time Rush - BTR "Spotify" (GOLD & 5× PLATINUM)
Big Time Rush - Famous "Single" (GOLD & 2× PLATINUM)
Almost Alice - Soundtrack (GOLD & PLATINUM)
Paul Stanley - Live To Win (Single) (GOLD & X2 PLATINUM)
Alice Cooper - Welcome 2 My Nightmare - (3× PLATINUM)
Deep Purple - Infinite "Russia" (GOLD)
Deep Purple - Infinite "Czech Republic" (GOLD)
Deep Purple - Infinite "Poland" (GOLD)
Deep Purple - Infinite "Hungary" (GOLD)
Deep Purple - Infinite "Germany" (GOLD)
Deep Purple - Infinite "Europe" (IMPALA PLATINUM)
Umberto Tozzi & Anastacia - Ti Amo (GOLD)
Glee - The Graduation Album (GOLD & PLATINUM)
Glee - The Music Season 4 Vol 1 (GOLD & 3× PLATINUM)
Glee - Love Songs (GOLD & 14× Platinum)
Glee - Some Nights (Single) (GOLD & 3× PLATINUM)
Glee - Don't Speak (Single) (GOLD & PLATINUM)
Glee - It's All Coming Back To Me Now (Single) (GOLD & 2× PLATINUM)
Glee - Roots Before Branches (Single) (GOLD & PLATINUM)
Glee - Tongue Tied (Single) (GOLD)
Glee - Paradise By The Dashboard Light (Single) (GOLD & PLATINUM)
Glee - Never Say Never (Single) (GOLD)
Isac Elliot - Follow Me (GOLD + PLATINUM)
Isac Elliot - Follow Me "Digital version" (GOLD)
Tina Arena - Eleven (GOLD)
David Hasselhoff - You Are Everything "Austria" (GOLD)
David Hasselhoff - You Are Everything "Switzerland" (GOLD)
Dr Alban - One Love "Austria" (GOLD & PLATINUM)
Dr Alban - One Love "Germany" (GOLD)
Dr Alban - One Love "Switzerland" (GOLD & PLATINUM)
Dr Alban - Sing Hallelujah (Single) " (GOLD & 2× PLATINUM)
Jill Johnson - Being Who I Am  (GOLD)
The Poodles - Metal Will Stand Tall (GOLD)
David Archuleta - s/t - (US Version) (GOLD)
David Archuleta - s/t - (Digital Version) (GOLD & 3× PLATINUM)
Jan Johansen - Minnen (GOLD)
Björn Skifs - Da Capo (GOLD)
Smith & Thell - Hippie Van (GOLD)
Star Pilots - Higher (GOLD)
Star Pilots - Higher "Spotify" (GOLD)
Idol 2010 (GOLD)
Idol - All I Need Is You (GOLD & PLATINUM)
Oscar Zia - Human (GOLD & 2× PLATINUM)
Markoolio - En Vecka I Phuket (GOLD)
Outtrigger - Echo - (GOLD)
Melodifestivalen 2003 (GOLD & 3× PLATINUM)
Melodifestivalen 2003 DVD (GOLD & PLATINUM)
Melodifestivalen 2009 (GOLD & 4× PLATINUM)
Melodifestivalen 2010 (GOLD & 5× PLATINUM)
Melodifestivalen 2011 (GOLD & 5× PLATINUM)
Melodifestivalen 2012 (GOLD & 4× PLATINUM)
Melodifestivalen 2013 (GOLD & 4× PLATINUM)
Melodifestivalen 2014 (GOLD & 2× PLATINUM)
Melodifestivalen 2015 (GOLD & PLATINUM)
Melodifestivalen 2016 (GOLD & PLATINUM)
Rix FM - Festival 2009 (GOLD)
Rix FM - Bäst Musik Just Nu 2010 (GOLD)
Absolute Kidz 26 (GOLD)
Absolute Dance Anthems (GOLD & PLATINUM)
Absolute Party Anthems (GOLD)
Absolute Music 15 (GOLD & PLATINUM)
Absolute Music 60 (GOLD & PLATINUM)
Absolute Music 62 (GOLD & PLATINUM)
Absolute Music 63 (GOLD)
Absolute Hits 2009 (GOLD)
Absolute Summer Hits 2009 (GOLD & PLATINUM)
Absolute Summer Hits 2012 (GOLD)
Absolute Sommar 2012 (GOLD)
Hits for kids summer party 2012 (GOLD)

Other recordings - LP/CD

1983
ATC - Soundtrack - Compilation

1984
ATC - Cut In Ice
ATC - Cut In Ice - Cassette version
ATC - Cut In Ice - Digital version
Janne Berlin - s/t
Gerry - s/t

1985
OZ - Decibel Storm - Vinyl Version
OZ - Decibel Storm - US Vinyl Version
Arkham Asylum - s/t 
Aquarius - Portrait 
Asian Ambient - s/t

1986
The Recorder
Alexia - s/t
Marie Andersson - Frihet Under Bar Himmel
Alliance - Spotlight 
Ari Amber - Songs
Johan Andersson - First!
Rixvaxx - Compilation
Karl Mayor - All Stars Project
Fat City - Heroes & Losers

1987
Angels Delight - s/t 
John Boyd - s/t 
Jimmy Braden - Sleight Of Hand 
The Breathtaking - Beginnings
Angel Heart - 
Anja - s/t
Dark Angel - Second Coming
The Notice - Live In Stockholm
Markus Lilja - Emotions
Vinjett - Dansa Med Oss
Sunset Warriors - Demons & Beasts

1988
Talk Of The Town - s/t "Promo"
Talk Of The Town - s/t
Talk Of The Town - s/t - Cassette Version
Talk Of The Town - s/t LP Version
Talk Of The Town - s/t German LP Version
Talk Of The Town - s/t German CD Version
Talk Of The Town - s/t Russian Version
Yale Bate - On The Prowl
Änglarna - s/t
Manuel De Pepe -  
Development - Party Of Funk
Neil Drake - Decisions 
Dream Grooves - Summer Of Grooves
Elbow - s/t

1989
Kent Kroon - Couldn't Hurt - 1989
Annica - s/t
Emerald City - Crazy Daze
Gilley's -  s/t 
Annica Burman – I Can't Deny A Broken Heart
Emotions - Flying Higher 
Enemy Child - Wrath
Firebirds - Tic & Tacle 
Funeral - It' Ain't Over Yet 
Futureperfect - Praise The Fallen 
Christina G - Signing On
Belinda - Under A New Sun I Walk 
Belly - s/t
Fuse - s/t

1990
Boney Rides - s/t
Yale Bate - Business & Pleasure
Swedish Rock Graffiti Vol 1
Annika Burman - Watch Out
Boxer - s/t
Rat Bat Blue - Squeak
Rat Bat Blue - Squeak - Vinyl Version
Rat Bat Blue - Squeak - Russian Version
Big At Birth - s/t 
Big Planet - Shelter 
Big Planet - Shelter - Japan 
Biosphere -
Blackhole
Abyss - s/t
Glory - Crisis VS Crisis 
Gold - s/t n
Blue Weather - 
Bodies And Souls - Dancin' Up A Storm 
BoobieBrothers - Vol 1
Bounce - s/t

1991
 Dag Finn - The Wonderful World Of
 Dag Finn - The Wonderful World Of - Vinyl version
 Dag Finn - The Wonderful World Of - Cassette version
Joey Gorkey - My Valentine 
Groove Army - March To Our Beat 
Gunfighter -
Headphones - In ’n Out In A Heartbeat
HEAT - s/t 
Viktoria Hellberg - Out Of Shape
Hi-Fi Kids - 
Holy - Spirit 
Hollow Horse - 
Jennifer Hollseers  -

1992
Dr Alban - One Love (GOLD & PLATINUM)
Dr Alban - One Love "2nd Edition"
Dr Alban - One Love (The DJ Album - Double Vinyl - Promo Version
Dr Alban - One Love - Cassette - English Version
Dr Alban - One Love - English Version
Dr Alban - One Love - Vinyl - English Version
Dr Alban - One Love - Cassette - Chile Version
Dr Alban - One Love - Chile Version
Dr Alban - One Love - Cassette - American Version
Dr Alban - One Love - American Version
Dr Alban - One Love - Vinyl - American Version
Dr Alban - One Love - Cassette - Mexican Version
Dr Alban - One Love - Mexican Version
Dr Alban - One Love - Vinyl - Mexican Version
Dr Alban - One Love - Cassette - Colombian Version
Dr Alban - One Love - Colombian Version
Dr Alban - One Love - Vinyl - Colombian Version
Dr Alban - One Love - Cassette - Polish Version
Dr Alban - One Love - Cassette - Indian Version
Dr Alban - One Love - Cassette - Turkish Version
Dr Alban - One Love - Cassette - South African Version
Dr Alban - One Love - South African Version
Dr Alban - One Love - Vinyl - South African Version
Planet 3 feat Jay Graydon - Music From The Planet "Swedish version"
Mighty M - s/t
Earthquake - The Truth
Earthquake - The Truth "2nd edition"
Milburn - s/t 
Promotion Music 92 - For Sale
Hometown Clowns - Out Of Control 
Hometown Heroes - s/t
Merritts - s/t 
Mirage
Miranda

1993
David Hasselhoff - You Are Everything (GOLD X2)
David Hasselhoff - You Are Everything - Club Version
David Hasselhoff - You Are Everything - Cassette Version
Dr Alban - One Love - Second Edition - American Version
Dr Alban - One Love - Second Edition - Cassette - American Version
Dr Alban - One Love - Second Edition - European Version
Dr Alban - One Love - Second Edition - Cassette - European Version
Dr Alban - One Love - Vinyl Russian Version
Dr Alban - One Love - It's My Life Version - American Version
Dr Alban - One Love - It's My Life Version - Cassette - American Version
Dr Alban - One Love - It's My Life Version - European Version
Dr Alban - One Love - It's My Life Version - Cassette - European Version
Hitman Volume 3
Dance Machine
Maxi Dance Sensation 10
Dance 93 - Compilation
Hot And Fresh - Die Internationalen Superhits
DJ Irai Campos & O Som Das Pistas 4
BLJ Group - s/t
Unanimated - In The Forest Of The Dreaming Dead
Unanimated - In The Forest Of The Dreaming Dead - Vinyl Version
Unanimated - In The Forest Of The Dreaming Dead "2nd edition - missprint"
Unanimated - In The Forest Of The Dreaming Dead "3rd edition"
Unanimated - In The Forest Of The Dreaming Dead - Japanese version
Unanimated - In The Forest Of The Dreaming Dead - Russian Version
Unanimated - In The Forest Of The Dreaming Dead - Cassette Version
Mother Earth Records - Coming Up
Mikael Nordfors - Lux Eterna
Morpheus - Son Of Hypnos

1994
Planet 3 feat Jay Graydon - Music From The Planet "German version"
Mirrorball - Open For Business 
Mirrorball - It's About Timeing
Unanimated - In The Forest Of The Dreaming Dead - US Version
Walker - A Modern Life
Eyes Wide Open - EWO 
Hard As A Rock -
Atlantic - That Secret Place
Aura - Section 18
Top 40 Remixes

1995
Tommy Denander - Less Is More
Tommy Denander - Skeleton
Tommy Denander - Less Is More & Skeleton
Lion's Share - s/t
Dr Alban - Best
Mega Dance Party - 3
Blackend - The Black Metal Compilation Vol 1 - US CD Version
Blackend - The Black Metal Compilation Vol 1 - UK 3 LP Version
Blackend - The Black Metal Compilation Vol 1 - Polish Cassette Version

1996
Tommy Denander - Less Is More "Asia"
Fee Waybill - Don't be Scared By These Hands (US version)
Fee Waybill - Don't be Scared By These Hands (German version)
Fee Waybill - Don't be Scared By These Hands (Swedish version)
The Encyclopedia Of Swedish Hard Rock & Heavy Metal 1970-1996
Blackend - The Black Metal Compilation Vol 1 - UK CD Version
Blackend - The Black Metal Compilation Vol 1 - US Metal Blade CD Version

1997
Tommy Denander - Limited Access
Tommy Denander - Guitar Czar
Lion's Share - Two
Locomotive Breath - Train Of Events
Westcoast Radio Hits - Rock
Trembling - 
Evil Force - 
Godspeed - 
Soul Pack - 
Desotos - Live
Dr Alban - Sampler "The Very Best Of 1990-1997"
Dr Alban - The Very Best Of 1990-1997

1998
Breed - s/t 
Diego Lopez - 
Locomotive Breath - Train Of Events - Japanese Version
Ron Brown - Reunited 
Burning Spear - From Monday To Sunday 
Burrito - s/t
Aina - Living In A Boy's World 
Almeeda - s/t 
Andersson Emma - s/t

1999
Denander - Gatisch - Counterparts
Prisoner - Blind
Prisoner - Blind - Japanese Version
Sayit - s/t
Lion's Share - Fall From Grace
Basket - Looser
Mia Axén - Livet Och Vägen 
Rosie Bahiana -
Jenai Abilene - Cool Me Down 
Acapulco Gold - s/t 
Adrenalin Engine - 
A.F.S - Soulin’ -
Electroligh -t
Starfire -
Santiago Diablo - Deluxe
Taxfree - 
Steam Train -
Hits Of The 90's

2000
Rainmaker - s/t
Rainmaker - s/t - Japanese Version
Talk Of The Town - The Ways Of The World
Talk Of The Town - The Ways Of The World  - Japanese Version
Lion's Share - Perspective
Hot News - Front Page Kids
Tempo - 
Guns & Girls - Loaded
Fly On The Wall - 
Capture The Moment - 
Rattle The Cage - 
Revolution -
Dark Matters -
Close Encounters -
7 Points -
Back In TIme -
Breakdown - 
Promises -
Living Large -
Steel Wings -
Jake's Garage -
Hits Of The 90's - Compilation

2001
Radioactive - Ceremony Of Innocence - Promo
Radioactive - Ceremony Of Innocence (missprint version 1)
Radioactive - Ceremony Of Innocence (missprint version 2)
Radioactive - Ceremony Of Innocence
Radioactive - Ceremony Of Innocence - Japanese Version
Radioactive - Ceremony Of Innocence - Russian Version
Prisoner - II
Sayit - Again
Buye Khak, Shahriar Hamidinia
Lion's Share -  Entrance
Eclipse - The Truth And A Little More
Eclipse - The Truth And A Little More - Czech Republic version
Eclipse - The Truth And A Little More - Russian version
Rapaces - Experiment - Compilation

2002
Jamie Meyer - s/t
Guitars For Freedom - II
Guitars For Freedom - II - Taiwan Version
Sha-Boom - Fiiire: The Best Of
Jason Becker - Warmth In The Wilderness II 
Jason Becker - Warmth In The Wilderness II "Japan"
Jason Becker - Warmth In The Wilderness II "Brazil"
Domination -
Seventy-Seven -
Tribute To Boston - s/t
Tribute To Boston - s/t - Japanese Version
Thrill Seekers -
AOR - L.A. Reflection
AOR - L.A. Reflection - Japanese Version
Energized -
Inside Out -
Instinctively -
Round & Round -
Vinyl Dreams -
Street Talk - Restoration - Promo
Street Talk - Restoration
Street Talk - Restoration - Japanese Version
Profly -
Surrender -
The Make Believers -
Sister Groove -
Vendetta -
Mind Games -
Dealer -
Waiting Game -
Change Of Heart -
Lost In Paradise -
State Of Art -
Devills -
Lady Starlight -
Reckless Warriors -
Gone Down In Flames - 
Tiger -

2003
Radioactive - Yeah - promo
Radioactive - Yeah
Radioactive - Yeah - Japanese Version
Radioactive - Yeah - Russian Version
Jim Jidhed - Full Circle
Jim Jidhed - Full Circle - Japanese Version +1
Silver - Intruder
Silver - Intruder Promo Version
Silver - Intruder Russian Version
Silver - Intruder +1 Japan
Sayit - Louder - promo
Sayit - Louder
Sayit - Louder - Russian Version
Urban Tale - Signs Of Times - Promo
Urban Tale - Signs Of Times
Urban Tale - Signs Of Times - Japanese Version
Barbados - Hela Himlen
Fame Factory - Vol 6
Talisman - Genesis Reissue
AOR - Dreaming Of L.A. - Promo
AOR - Dreaming Of L.A. 
AOR - Dreaming Of L.A. - Japanese Version
Last Autumn's Dream - s/t - XTC Version
Last Autumn's Dream - s/t - Japanese Version
Last Autumn's Dream - s/t - Russian Version
Last Autumn's Dream - s/t - Italian Version
Kill Your Darlings - 
Voodoo Pop - 
Historica - 
Back Door Men - 
After Dark - Standing On The Corner 
Aimee - s/t 
Aimee - Around The Corner 
Book David - Gottsundas Alla Hörn 
Book David feat T Denander - Tied To The Blues 
Boongi Bandits - 3 Chords And An Image 
Locomotive Breath - Train Of Events - Reissue
Borderland - s/t 
Borderline - 
Born Too Rule - Eat This 
Bosson - "Asia"
Rixrock - 
De Andra - 
Breed Evil - 
Catch - 
Elevator Pilots -
Jannez - 
Reckless Road - 
Otto & The Raise Your Fists
36 Svenska Klassiker 1990 - 2000

2004
Spin Gallery - Standing Tall
Spin Gallery - Standing Tall - Japanese Version
The Rasmus - Live Letters - Russian Version
Urban Tale - A Sign Of The Times
AOR - Nothing But The Best
AOR - Nothing But The Best - Japanese Version
Deacon Street Project - s/t - Promo
Deacon Street Project - s/t
Sandra Dahlberg - Här Stannar Jag Kvar
Shortino-Northrup - Afterlife
7 Gates - Fire Walk With Me - Promo
7 Gates - Fire Walk With Me
7 Gates - Fire Walk With Me - Russian Version
7 Gates - Fire Walk With Me - Portugal Version
Last Autumn's Dream - s/t - Promo
Last Autumn's Dream - s/t - Frontiers Version
Last Autumn's Dream - s/t - Russian Version
Last Autumn's Dream - s/t - South Korean Version
Last Autumn's Dream - s/t - Cassette - Thailand
Last Autumn's Dream - II - Japanese Version
Last Autumn's Dream - II - South Korean Version
Last Autumn's Dream - II - Seoul Version
Fame Factory - Vol 7
Fame Factory - Vol 8
Mr Music - Hits 8
Silver - Addictions
Silver - Addictions Promo Version
Silver - Addictions Russian Version
Silver - Addictions +1 Japan
Phoebe Aklaff  - Mantras
Per Albinsson - Nattsångens vingar 
Per Albinsson - Att Dansa Med Vinden
Sledgehammer - 
Skizzofrenics - 
Highway Of Tears - 
Colorblind - 
The Sweet According To Sweden
The Sweet According To Sweden - Russian Version
Soul Magnets - 
Silverlining
Audiovision - s/t - Japanese Version
Street Talk - Destination
Street Talk - Destination - Japanese Version
Street Talk - Destination - Russian Version

2005
Tommy Denander - Line 6
Radioactive - Taken - Promo
Radioactive - Taken
Radioactive - Taken Russian Version
Radioactive - Taken - Japanese Version
Radioactive - Taken "DVD" edition
Radioactive - Melodicrock.com V3 Compilation
Frederiksen - Denander - Frontiers - Rock The Bones Vol 3
Philip Bardowell - In The Cut - "promo" 
Philip Bardowell - In The Cut 
Philip Bardowell - In The Cut + 1 - "Japan" 
Philip Bardowell - In The Cut - Russian Version
Philip Bardowell - In The Cut - "USA" 
Philip Bardowell - Rock The Bones Vol 3 
Philip Bardowell - Rock It Hear It Compilation 21
Philip Bardowell - Melodicrock.com Vol 4 Melodic Still Rocks
Jimi Hendrix Tribute - The Spirit Lives On II
Jimi Hendrix Tribute - The Spirit Lives On II - Russian Version
Fronda - Livet Genom En Pansarvagnspipa
Jill Johnson - Being Who I Am  (GOLD)
Silver - Gold
Silver - Gold Promo Version
Silver - Gold Russian Version
Silver - Gold +1 Japan
Heartbreak Radio - s/t - Promo
Heartbreak Radio - s/t
Last Autumn's Dream - II - Promo
Last Autumn's Dream - II - European Version
Last Autumn's Dream - II - Russian Version
Balance II - s/t
Audiovision - s/t - Promo
Audiovision - s/t - Rivel Version
Audiovision - s/t - Metal Heaven Version
Audiovision - s/t - Japanese Version
Audiovision - s/t - Russian Version
Jet Circus - Look At Death now - promo
Jet Circus - Look At Death now
Jaded Heart - Helluva Time
Jaded Heart - Helluva Time - Japanese Version
Christina Lindberg - Tills Vägen Tar Slut
Novak - Forever Endeavour
Novak - Forever Endeavour - Japanese Version
Mistheria - Messenger Of The Gods
Sha-Boom - The Race Is On

2006
Paul Stanley - Live To Win - US Version
Paul Stanley - Live To Win - Japanese Version
Paul Stanley - Live To Win - Russian Version
Paul Stanley - Live To Win - Australian/Asian Version
Paul Stanley - Live To Win - Canadian Version
Paul Stanley - Live To Win - European Version
Paul Stanley - Live To Win - South African Version
Paul Stanley - Live To Win - Argentina Version
Paul Stanley - Live To Win - El Salvador Limited Vinyl Version
Radioactive - Play Station 08-06 Russian Magazine Compilation
Michael Bormann - Conspiracy
Michael Bormann - Conspiracy - Swiss Version
Michael Bormann - Conspiracy - Russian Version
Kelly Keagy - I'm Alive - Promo
Kelly Keagy - I'm Alive
Kelly Keagy - I'm Alive - Japanese Version
Kelly Keagy - I'm Alive - US Version
Kelly Keagy - I'm Alive - Russian Version
Deacon Street Project - II - Promo Version
Deacon Street Project - II
Liberty N' Justice - Soundtrack Of A Soul - Promo
Liberty N' Justice - Soundtrack Of A Soul
Liberty N' Justice - Soundtrack Of A Soul - US Version
Liberty N' Justice - Soundtrack Of A Soul - Russian Version
Sofia Draco - Flying With You
The Poodles - Metal Will Stand Tall (GOLD)
The Poodles - Metal Will Stand Tall - promo Version
The Poodles - Metal Will Stand Tall - Japanese Version
The Poodles - Metal Will Stand Tall - Russian Version
The Poodles - Metal Will Stand Tall - Swedish Version
Ambition - s/t - "promo" 
Ambition - s/t
Ambition - s/t - Spanish Version
Ambition - s/t - Russian Version
Ambition - s/t +1 Japan
Ambition - Rock The Bones Vol 3
Gary John Barden - The Agony And Xtasy
Audiovision - s/t - Russian Version
AOR - LA Attraction
AOR - LA Attraction - Japanese Version
AOR - LA Attraction - Russian Version
AOR - LA Concession + 4 (Reissue)
Speedy Gonzales- Electric Stalker - Promo Version
Speedy Gonzales- Electric Stalker
Speedy Gonzales- Electric Stalker - Japanese Version
OZ - Decibel Storm - Reissue CD - Swedish Version
The Ultimate Football Songs
Concrete Approved - Compilation

2007
Paul Stanley - Live To Win - Ukraine Version
Frederiksen - Denander - Baptism By Fire - Promo
Frederiksen - Denander - Baptism By Fire - Spanish Promo
Frederiksen - Denander - Baptism By Fire
Frederiksen - Denander - Baptism By Fire - Russian Version
Frederiksen - Denander - Baptism By Fire - Japanese Version
Frederiksen - Denander - Frontiers - Rock The Bones Vol 5 - promo - 2007
Frederiksen - Denander - Frontiers - Rock The Bones Vol 5 Promo Version
Frederiksen - Denander - Frontiers - Rock The Bones Vol 5
Frederiksen - Denander - Let The Hammer Fall Vol 61 - Compilation
Robin Beck - Living On A Dream - Promo Version
Robin Beck - Living On A Dream
Robin Beck - Living On A Dream - Russian Version
ATC - Cut In Ice - Reissue CD Version Brazil
Voices Of Rock - MMVII - Promo
Voices Of Rock - MMVII
Voices Of Rock - MMVII - Japanese Version
Voices Of Rock - MMVII - Russian Version
Voices Of Rock - MMVII - Spanish Version
Los Angeles - s/t - Promo Version
Los Angeles - s/t
Los Angeles - s/t - Russian Version
Los Angeles - s/t - Japanese Version
Last Autumn's Dream - Impressions Best Of - Japanese Version
TRW - Rivers Of Paradise
David Readman - s/t - Promo
David Readman - s/t
David Readman - s/t - Japanese Version
David Readman - s/t - Russian Version
Jim Jidhed - Reflektioner
Cecilia Vennersten - Under Stjärnornas Parasoll
Newman - Primitive Soul
Newman - Primitive Soul + 3 - Digital Version
Stan Bush - In This Life - Promo
Stan Bush - In This Life
Stan Bush - In This Life - US Version
Stan Bush - In This Life - Japanese Version
Stan Bush - In This Life - Russian Version
The Poodles - Sweet Trade
Chris Catena - Born Again
Christian Ingebrigtsen - The Truth About Lies
The Lec Zorn Project - It Began In The Underground
David Diggs - NeoTekWerk
Union Mac - Lost In Attraction
Thomas Svensson & Statoil - Handbollslandslaget
Dalida Maras - Hjärtats Kung

2008
David Archuleta - s/t - US Version (GOLD)
David Archuleta - s/t - ITunes Version
David Archuleta - s/t - Walmart Version
David Archuleta - s/t - Japan Version
David Archuleta - s/t - UK Version
David Archuleta - s/t - Indonesian Version
David Archuleta - s/t - Canadian Version
David Archuleta - s/t - South African Version
Sayit - s/t - Remastered + 1 Bonus track
House Of Lords - Welcome To My Kingdom - Promo Version
House Of Lords - Welcome To My Kingdom
House Of Lords - Welcome To My Kingdom - Japanese Version
House Of Lords - Welcome To My Kingdom - Russian Version
House Of Lords - Welcome To My Kingdom - Swedish Version
Michael Bormann - Capture The Moment
Michael Bormann - Capture The Moment - Russian Version
Golden Talents - For The Love Of Music
Indigo Dying - s/t - Promo
Indigo Dying - s/t
Indigo Dying - s/t - Japanese Version
Indigo Dying - s/t - Russian Version
Indigo Dying - s/t - South Korea Version
LA Project - II
LA Project - II - Japanese Version
Fireworks - Compilation 34
Chris Catena - Booze, Brawds & Rockin' Hard
Myland - No Man's Land - Promo
Myland - No Man's Land
Myland - No Man's Land - Japanese Version
Myland - No Man's Land - Russian Version
Last Autumn's Dream - Impressions The Very Best of - Escape Version
Anna Karena - Everything Is In Your Mind
Shake - New Beginning
Kindbergs - Boots & Änglar
Newman - Decade
UMe - 4th Quarter Sports Sampler
Unanimated - In The Forest Of The Dreaming Dead - Reissue Sweden
Unanimated - In The Forest Of The Dreaming Dead - Reissue America
Unanimated - In The Forest Of The Dreaming Dead - Reissue Promo
Unanimated - In The Forest Of The Dreaming Dead - Cassette Version Bulgaria
Unanimated - In The Forest Of The Dreaming Dead - Cassette Version Russia
OZ - Decibel Storm - Reissue, remastered CD Version
Ben Liebrand - Zomermix 2008

2009
Toto - Hold The Line/The Very Best Of - Swedish Compilation
Spin Gallery - Embrace
Spin Gallery - Embrace - Japanese Version
Impulsia - Expressions
Jan Johansen - Minnen (GOLD)
House Of Lords - Cartesian Dreams
House Of Lords - Cartesian Dreams - Japanese Promo Version
House Of Lords - Cartesian Dreams - Japanese Version - Promo
House Of Lords - Cartesian Dreams - Japanese Version
House Of Lords - Cartesian Dreams - Russian Version
House Of Lords - Cartesian Dreams - Argentina Version
Los Angeles - Neverland
Los Angeles - Neverland - Japanese Version
Los Angeles - Neverland - Russian Version
The Poodles - The Clash Of The Elements
Lion's Share - Dark Hours
Chris Catena - Discovery
Jaded Heart - Perfect Insanity
Bara Vänner - Mmm...Att Vilja Ha
Kim - s/t
Mitch Malloy - Live At Firefest
Jimi Jamison - Crossroads Moments
Jimi Jamison - Crossroads Moments - Japanese Version
Jimi Jamison - Crossroads Moments - Russian Version
ARfm - The Undying Fire
Grand Design - Time Elevation
Grand Design - Time Elevation - Promo Version
Grand Design - Time Elevation
Grand Design - Time Elevation - Russian Version
Tigermom - Give In
Robin Beck - Trouble Or Nothing 20th Anniversary Edition
AOR - Journey To LA
Last Autumn's Dream - The Very Best Of LAD & Live In Germany
Last Autumn's Dream - The Very Best Of LAD & Live In Germany - Japanese Version
You Raise Me Up - Songs Of Hope & Inspiration

2010
Tokio Hotel - Almost Alice Soundtrack (GOLD & PLATINUM)
Tokio Hotel - Almost Alice Soundtrack - Argentina Version
Tokio Hotel - Almost Alice Soundtrack - Russian Version 1
Tokio Hotel - Almost Alice Soundtrack - Russian Version 2
Tokio Hotel - Almost Alice Soundtrack - Ukraine Version
Tokio Hotel - Almost Alice Soundtrack - European Version
Tokio Hotel - Almost Alice Soundtrack - Brazilian Version
Tokio Hotel - Almost Alice Soundtrack - Japanese Version
Tokio Hotel - Almost Alice Soundtrack - Mexican Version
Tokio Hotel - Almost Alice Soundtrack - UK Version
Tokio Hotel - Almost Alice Soundtrack - Australian Version
Tokio Hotel - Almost Alice Soundtrack - Canadian Version
Tokio Hotel - Almost Alice Soundtrack - US Hot Topic Version
Tokio Hotel - Almost Alice Soundtrack - US Promo Version
Tokio Hotel - Almost Alice Soundtrack - UK Promo Version
Björn Skifs - Da Capo (GOLD)
House Of Lords - Power Ballads Compilation
Play - Under My Skin
Py Bäckman - P20Y10
Scandinavian Strings - Attached
Denise Lopez - Black Lace & Leather
Houston - s/t
Houston - s/t - Promo
Houston - s/t - UK Version
Bangalore Choir - Cadence - Promo
Bangalore Choir - Cadence
Bangalore Choir - Cadence - Russian Version
Bangalore Choir - Cadence - German Version
Idol 2010 (GOLD)
Idol - Boxen 2004 - 2010
AOR - LA Ambition
Gary John Barden - Rock & Roll My Soul
Die Hit-Giganten - Eurodance

2011
Alice Cooper - Welcome 2 My Nightmare
Alice Cooper - Welcome 2 My Nightmare "Bonus track version"
Alice Cooper - Welcome 2 My Nightmare "Fan Pack version UK"
Alice Cooper - Welcome 2 My Nightmare "Deluxe edition "Canada, Japan, Best Buy"
Alice Cooper - Welcome 2 My Nightmare "Double LP vinyl edition Version 1"
Alice Cooper - Welcome 2 My Nightmare "Double LP vinyl edition Version 2"
Alice Cooper - Welcome 2 My Nightmare "Double LP vinyl edition Version 3"
Alice Cooper - Welcome 2 My Nightmare "Bonus track version"
Alice Cooper - Welcome 2 My Nightmare "Deluxe Digipack CD edition"
Alice Cooper - Welcome 2 My Nightmare "Argentina Version"
Alice Cooper - Welcome 2 My Nightmare "Brazilian Version"
Alice Cooper - Welcome 2 My Nightmare "Indonesia Version"
Alice Cooper - Welcome 2 My Nightmare "Canada Version"
Alice Cooper - Welcome 2 My Nightmare "Malaysia Version"
Alice Cooper - Welcome 2 My Nightmare "Russia Version 1"
Alice Cooper - Welcome 2 My Nightmare "Russia Version 2"
Alice Cooper - Welcome 2 My Nightmare "Poland Version"
Alice Cooper - Welcome 2 My Nightmare "Australia Version"
Alice Cooper - Welcome 2 My Nightmare "Europe Limited Edition Version"
Ricky Martin - MAS "USA version" (GOLD & PLATINUM)
Ricky Martin - MAS "Target version" (GOLD & PLATINUM)
Ricky Martin - MAS "Brazilian version" (GOLD & PLATINUM)
Ricky Martin - MAS "Argentina version" (GOLD & PLATINUM)
Ricky Martin - MAS "Chile version" (GOLD, PLATINUM & DIAMOND)
Ricky Martin - MAS "Colombia version" (GOLD & 2× PLATINUM)
Ricky Martin - MAS "Mexico version" (GOLD & PLATINUM)
Ricky Martin - MAS "Venezuela version" (GOLD & PLATINUM)
Ricky Martin - MAS "US Fan version"
Ricky Martin - MAS "European double CD version"
Ricky Martin - MAS "European 1 CD version"
Ricky Martin - MAS "South American Fan version"
Ricky Martin - MAS "Austrian & German version"
Ricky Martin - MAS "Japanese version"
Ricky Martin - MAS "Russian version"
Ricky Martin - MAS "Fan Edition + DVD version"
Phenomena - Blind Faith
Phenomena - Blind Faith - Japanese Version
Phenomena - Blind Faith - Russian Version
Robin Beck - The Great Escape
Robin Beck - The Great Escape - US Version
Robin Beck - The Great Escape - Russian Version
Robin Beck - *Believe In Me, The Finest Rock Ballads - Compilation
Robin Beck - KuschelRock 25 - Das Jubiläumsalbum - Compilation
Wild @ Heart - The Return of Metal Ballads, Vol. 1
House Of Lords - Big Money
House Of Lords - Big Money Japanese version
House Of Lords - Big Money Russian version
House Of Lords - Big Money Argentina version
Jimi Jamison & Jim Peterik - Extra Moments
Jimi Jamison & Jim Peterik - Extra Moments 2nd Edition
Jimi Jamison & Jim Peterik - Extra Moments +1
Jimi Jamison & Jim Peterik - Extra Moments - Russian Version
Jimi Jamison - Live At Firefest 2010
One Man's Trash Jimi Jamison - History - Promo
One Man's Trash Jimi Jamison - History
Dan Reed - Coming Up For Air
Dan Reed - Live At Union Chapel London
Big Time Rush - Best Of Season 1
Big Time Rush - BTR "International version" (PLATINUM)
Big Time Rush - BTR "Greece" (5× PLATINUM)
Big Time Rush - BTR "Mexico" (PLATINUM)
Big Time Rush - BTR "Indonesia"
Big Time Rush - BTR "UK" 
Chris Ousey - Rhyme & Reason
Chris Ousey - Rhyme & Reason - Russian Version
Chris Ousey - Rhyme & Reason - Japanese Version
Houston - s/t
Houston - s/t "UK version with 2 bonus tracks"
Williams - Friestedt - s/t
Williams - Friestedt - s/t - Promo
Williams - Friestedt - s/t - Japanese version
Williams - Friestedt - s/t - Japanese Mini LP version
Williams - Friestedt - Rocks Nr23 - Compilation
Lionville - s/t
Lionville - s/t - Japanese Version
Lionville - s/t - Russian Version
Mecca - Undeniable
AOR - Journey To L.A.
AOR - Journey To L.A. - Russian Version
Bangalore Choir - All Or Nothing Live At Firefest 2010
Reece - Kronlund - Solid
Gary John Barden - Eleventh Hour
Wolfpakk - s/t
Wolfpakk - s/t - Russian Version
Rock For Japan
IDOL - Det Bästa Från 2010
Stonelake - Marching On Timeless Tales
Melodifestivalen - 10 år "Guld-boxen"
Melodifestivalen - 10 år "Silver-boxen"
Anders Fernette - Run
Sencelled -  s/t
Michael J Scott - Emotional
Classic Rock - Aormania
Die Hit Giganten - Dancefloor Hits

2012
Impera - Legacy Of Life
Impera - Legacy Of Life - Japanese Version
Impera - Shadows In Light
James Christian - Lay It All On Me
James Christian - Lay It All On Me - Japanese Version
James Christian - Lay It All On Me - Russian Version
James Christian - Lay It All On Me - Argentina Version
Metal/Hard Rock Covers - 571
AOR - LA Temptation
AOR - LA Temptation - Russian Version
AOR - Dreaming Of LA + 6 (Reissue)
AOR - LA Reflection + 4 (Reissue)
AOR - The Colors Of LA
AOR - The Colors Of L.A - Russian Version
Chasing Violets - Outside Heaven
MRCD9 - 15 Years Later
Phenomena - Awakening
Phenomena - Awakening - Japanese Version
Phenomena - Awakening - Russian Version
Harry Hess - Living In Yesterday - Promo
Harry Hess - Living In Yesterday
Harry Hess - Living In Yesterday - Japanese Version
Harry Hess - Living In Yesterday - Russian Version
Harry Hess - Living In Yesterday - Argentina Version
Glee - From Lima To New York - US Version
Glee - From Lima To New York - Brazilian Version
Glee - From Lima To New York - Australian Version
Glee - The Graduation Album - US Version
Glee - The Graduation Album - Australian Version
Glee - The Graduation Album - Brazilian Version
Glee - The Graduation Album - UK Version
Glee - The Graduation Album - Canadian Version
Joey Summer - One Bite From Paradise
Joey Summer - One Bite From Paradise - Russian Version
Joey Summer - OBFP - Brazil Version
2Dansant - Compilation

2013
Ricky Martin - Greatest Hits Souvenir Edition - Australia (GOLD)
Ricky Martin - Greatest Hits Souvenir Edition - Indonesia
Ricky Martin - Greatest Hits Souvenir Edition - Taiwan
Ricky Martin - Greatest Hits Souvenir Edition - China
Ricky Martin - Playlist, The Very Best Of
Ricky Martin - Greatest Hits 17
Ricky Martin - The Greatest Hits
Impera - Pieces Of Eden
Impera - Pieces Of Eden - Japanese Version
Impera - Pieces Of Eden - Russian Version
Robin Beck - Underneath
Robin Beck - Underneath - Japanese Version
Robin Beck - Underneath - Russian Version
Rage Of Angels - Dreamworld
Rage Of Angels - Dreamworld - Japanese Version
Rage Of Angels - Dreamworld - Russian Version
Kings In Exile - Here's To The Future
David Readman - DR
David Archuleta - Kelvin Nicolas Megamix
A World With Heroes: A Kiss Tribute For Cancer Care
Dansband - Får Jag Lov Vol 6
Dansband - Bugg
Shake - Bjud Upp Till Dans
Christina Lindberg - Mina Ljuva År
Pål Norman - Singing Sunsets
Reece - Compromise
Reece - Compromise - Russian Version
Place Vendome - Thunder In A Distance - Promo
Place Vendome - Thunder In A Distance - Digipack Version
Place Vendome - Thunder In A Distance
Place Vendome - Thunder In A Distance - Japanese Version
Place Vendome - Thunder In A Distance - LP Version
Place Vendome - Thunder In A Distance - Brazil Version
Place Vendome - Thunder In A Distance - South Korea Version
Place Vendome - Thunder In A Distance - Argentina Version
Place Vendome - Thunder In A Distance - Mexico Version
Place Vendome - Thunder In A Distance - Russian Version
Place Vendome - Thunder In A Distance - Greek Version
Chasing Violets - Jade Hearts
Chasing Violets - Jade Hearts - Japanese Version
Glee - The Complete Season Three
Glee - 3-CD Set
Glee - The Complete Season Four
Glee - The Complete Season Four Karaoke
Glee - The Music Season Four Vol 2
Jessica Gärdlund - S/T
Almost Alice - Soundtrack (GOLD)
Houston - II
Houston - II - Russian Version
Edge - Heaven Knows
Edge - Heaven Knows - Japanese Version
AOR - The Secrets Of L.A
AOR - The Secrets Of L.A - Japanese Version
AOR - The Secrets Of L.A - Russian Version
Ernie Skillen - The Gift
Small Rain - s/t
Calvin Bridges - Kiss Of Love
Heartbreak Radio - On Air
Heartbreak Radio - On Air - Japanese Version
The Feckers - It'd Be Rude Not To 
BeRock - Under The City Lights

2014
Robin Beck - Live At Sweden Rock Festival
Melodifestivalen 2014 (GOLD & 2× PLATINUM)
Isac Elliot - Follow Me (GOLD + PLATINUM)
Outtrigger - The Last Of Us
Pat Boone - Legacy (1st edition misprint)
Pat Boone - Legacy - 2014
Pat Boone - Legacy - TV Shop version
Close Quarters - Try To Pay Rent With Love
Seven - 7 - Japanese Version
AOR - LA Connection
AOR - LA Connection - Japanese Version
AOR - LA Connection - Russian Version
Bobby Kimball - Toto Star Luxury Pack Compilation
Captain Blackbeard - Before Plastic
Alan Morrison - The End Of The Song
Denise Lopez - Reflections
Rennie Mirro - I've Gotta Be Me
Linda & The Punch - Obsession
Kevin Walker - Belong
Lionville - Lionville reissue with bonus tracks
VSQ - Performs "Strange"
Lover Under Cover - Into The Night
Lover Under Cover - Into The Night - Japanese Version
Lover Under Cover - Into The Night - Russian Version
Michael J Scott - Emotional
Silver - Idolized The Very Best Of
Back To The 90's - Nr.1 Hits Der 90er
Absolute Jul
Radiogun - Checking Out

2015
Tina Arena - Eleven (GOLD)
Tina Arena - Eleven - Double Vinyl Version
Tina Arena - Eleven - UK Version
Tina Arena - Eleven - Deluxe Edition
Tina Arena - Eleven - Promo Version
Impera - Empire Of Sin
Impera - Empire Of Sin - Japanese Version
Radioactive - Four
Radioactive - Four - Japanese Version
Radioactive - Four - Russian Version
Melodifestivalen 2015 (GOLD & PLATINUM)
Dakota - Long Road Home
Bobby Kimball - El Festival Del Los Festivales (Vina Del Mar)
Torch - The Music Remembers Jimi Jamison & Fergie Frederiksen
House Of Lords - Indestructible
House Of Lords - Indestructible - Japanese Version
House Of Lords - Indestructible - Russian Version
House Of Lords - Indestructible - Greek Version
Hear It - Vol77
Absolute Music - 78
Mathias Melo - Musexpo 2015
AOR - The Best Of Dane Donohue
AOR - Unreleased Tracks
Talisman - Vaults Deluxe Edition
Fireworks - Compilation 70
Ozone - Self Defence
Ozone - Self Defence - Japanese Version
Gabe Treiyer - Unsung Hero
Grand Design - Time Elevation Re-Elevated
Street Talk - Restoration Reissue
Anne Marie Bush - Unzipped
The Boyscout - Route 66
Chris Ousey - Dream Machine
Chris Ousey - Dream Machine - Japanese Version
Chris Ousey - Dream Machine - Russian Version
Bobby Messano - Love & Money
Saints Trade - Robbed In Paradise
Morpheus - Son Of Hypnos - Reissue, remastered
Het Beste Uit De Schaamteloze 100 - Volume 3
Smith & Thell - Playground Music Hitit

2016
Drive She Said - Pedal To The Metal
Drive She Said - Pedal To The Metal - Japanese Version
AOR - LA Darkness
AOR - LA Darkness - US Version
AOR - LA Darkness - Russian Version
Melodifestivalen 2016 - (GOLD & PLATINUM)
Absolute Music - 80
Erika - Deaf, Dumb & Blonde
Erika - Deaf, Dumb & Blonde - Japanese Version
Erika - Deaf, Dumb & Blonde - Russian Version
Guru - Red
Chris Catena - Welcome To My Freak Out Show Live
Big Time Rush - 4 CD Box
Vivaldi Metal Project - The Four Seasons
Vivaldi Metal Project - The Four Seasons - Double Vinyl Version
Vivaldi Metal Project - The Four Seasons - Russian Version
Vivaldi Metal Project - The Four Seasons - Japanese Version
Overland - Contagious
Overland - Contagious - Japanese Version
Overland - Contagious - Russian Version
Hoggez Orkester - Personal Favorites - 2009 - 2015
Tommy Heart - Spirit Of Time
Tommy Heart - Spirit Of Time - Japanese Version
Big Time Rush - L'intégrale - Limited 3 CD + DVD cardboard box Version for France
Big Time Rush - The Greatest Hits
Robert Haglund - I Wanna Be Somebody
Morpheus - Son Of Hypnos - Limited Black vinyl
Morpheus - Son Of Hypnos - Limited Clear vinyl
Morpheus - Son Of Hypnos - Limited Orange vinyl
Morpheus - Son Of Hypnos - Reissue - Russian Version
Unanimated - In The Forest Of The Dreaming Dead - Reissue
Absolute Svensk Pop - 2016 Compilation
The 10's - 2016 Compilation
Made In Sweden- 2016 Compilation
Absolute 10's - 2016 Compilation
Mello - 2016 Compilation
Radio Hits 10's - 2016 Compilation
Svensk Musik 10-tal - 2016 Compilation
Mello - 100 Låtar - 2016 Compilation
2010's - 2016 Compilation
Svenska 10-talsfavoriter - 2016 Compilation
Svenskt 10-tal - 2016 Compilation
Swedish Pop Diamonds - 2016 Compilation
All 10's - 2016 Compilation
Mello - Ballader Compilation
50 Visor & Ballader Compilation
Mello - 2000-2019 Compilation
Mello - 2000-2020 Compilation
Galway Girl - Feelgood Pop Compilation

2017
Deep Purple - Infinite (4× GOLD)
Deep Purple - Infinite - CD + DVD Version
Deep Purple - Infinite - CD + DVD Limited Australian Version
Deep Purple - Infinite - CD + DVD Limited American Version
Deep Purple - Infinite - SHM-CD - Limited Japanese Version
Deep Purple - Infinite - Audiophile 48 kHz/24bit Version
Deep Purple - Infinite - Box Set European Deluxe Version
Deep Purple - Infinite - Box Set European Limited Version
Deep Purple - Infinite - Box Set US Version
Deep Purple - Infinite - Box Set Russian Version
Deep Purple - Infinite - Box Set Australian Version
Deep Purple - Infinite - French Version - Promo Version
Deep Purple - Infinite - French Version
Deep Purple - Infinite - Brazil Version
Deep Purple - Infinite - Russian Version
Deep Purple - Infinite - American Version
Deep Purple - Infinite - Japanese Version
Deep Purple - Infinite - Cassette UK Version
Deep Purple - Infinite - Korean Special Edition) 2CD
Deep Purple - Infinite - Double Vinyl + DVD
Deep Purple - Infinite - Double Vinyl Limited Purple Edition
Deep Purple - Infinite - Gold Edition 2CD
Deep Purple - Infinite - Gold Edition 2CD Russian Version
Alice Cooper - Paranormal
Alice Cooper - Paranormal - 3 song promo - France
Alice Cooper - Paranormal - US Version
Alice Cooper - Paranormal - Japanese Version
Alice Cooper - Paranormal - Russian Version
Alice Cooper - Paranormal - Australian Version
Alice Cooper - Paranormal - South African Version
Alice Cooper - Paranormal - Brazilian Version Version
Alice Cooper - Paranormal - German Version (12 tracks)
Alice Cooper - Paranormal - Box Set European Version
Alice Cooper - Paranormal - Box Set Japanese Version
Alice Cooper - Paranormal - Digipack Edition European Version
Alice Cooper - Paranormal - Digipack Edition US Version
Alice Cooper - Paranormal - Double Vinyl Black edition
Alice Cooper - Paranormal - Double Vinyl Limited Red edition
Alice Cooper - Paranormal - Double Vinyl Limited White edition
Alice Cooper - Paranormal - Tour Edition
Alice Cooper - Live At Wacken 2017 (bootleg)
Alice Cooper - Live At Gröna Lund/Stockholm 2017 (bootleg 1)
Alice Cooper - Live At Gröna Lund/Stockholm 2017 (bootleg 2)
Alice Cooper - Live At Liseberg/Gothenburg 2017 (bootleg)
Alice Cooper - Live in Mansfield 2017  
Alice Cooper - Live at Jahrhunderthalle, Frankfurt Germany 2017
Alice Cooper - Live at Arena Birmingham, England 2017
Alice Cooper - Live at TSB Bank Arena, Wellington New Zealand 2017
Alice Cooper - Live at Hordern Pavilion, Sydney Australia 2017
Alice Cooper - Greatest Hits "Russian Compilation"
Alice Cooper - RockHard compilation 178
Alice Cooper - Rock Tribune Compilation 167
Alice Cooper - Prog Magazine - Discovering Ear Music
Umberto Tozzi - Quarant’anni che ti amo
Umberto Tozzi - Radio Italia Live Il Concerto
I Love Italia - Polish Compilation
Anastacia - Evolution
Anastacia - Evolution - US Version
Anastacia - Evolution - Russian Version 1
Anastacia - Evolution - Russian Version 2
Anastacia - Evolution - Polish Version
Anastacia - Evolution - French Version
AOR - The Heart Of LA
AOR - Rare Tracks & Demos
Patricia Hill - Debut
Bobby Messano - Bad Movie
The Boyscout - We Were Kings
The Boyscout - We Were Kings - Russian Version
Hear It 91 - The Boyscout
House Of Lords - Saint Of The Lost Souls
House Of Lords - Saint Of The Lost Souls - Japanese Version
House Of Lords - Saint Of The Lost Souls - Russian Version
Tony Mills - Streets Of Chance
Tony Mills - Streets Of Chance - Japanese Version
Ronander - Wasteland
Sylver Logan Sharp - The Groovement
Tosh Ason - From My Heart
Robin Beck - Love Is Coming
Robin Beck - Love Is Coming - Japanese Version
Robin Beck - Love Is Coming - Russian Version
Steve Walsh - Black Butterfly
Steve Walsh - Black Butterfly - Japanese Version
Steve Walsh - Black Butterfly - Russian Version
Mecca - The Demos
Tommy Heart - Spirit Of Time - Russian Version
Eric Grensner - Lights
Tommy Denander - Hollie-Day Picks
Paolo Morbini Project
Paolo Morbini Project - Japanese Version
Björn Skifs - Every Bit Of My Life 1967-2017 (24 CD box)

2018
Steve Walsh - Black Butterfly - Vinyl version
James Christian - Craving
James Christian - Craving - Vinyl Version
James Christian - Craving - Japanese Version
AOR - More Demos from L.A
Classic Rock Magazine - Best Of The Year 2017
Alice Cooper - Live at Wang Theatre, Boston 2018
Alice Cooper - Live at Ovens Auditorium, Charlotte, North Carolina 2018
Alice Cooper - A Paranormal Evening At The Olympia Paris - European Version
Alice Cooper - A Paranormal Evening At The Olympia Paris - American Version
Alice Cooper - A Paranormal Evening At The Olympia Paris - Australian Version
Alice Cooper - A Paranormal Evening At The Olympia Paris - Russian Version
Alice Cooper - A Paranormal Evening At The Olympia Paris - Brazilian Version
Alice Cooper - A Paranormal Evening At The Olympia Paris - Vinyl Version (Black)
Alice Cooper - A Paranormal Evening At The Olympia Paris - Vinyl Version (Colored)
Alice Cooper - A Paranormal Evening At The Olympia Paris - Vinyl Version (Picture Discs)
Alice Cooper - Russian Compilation (Bootleg)
Alice Cooper - Alive In This Nightmare (Bootleg)
Ricky Martin -  Compilation
Clif Magness - Lucky Dog
Clif Magness - Lucky Dog - Japanese Version
Hansen-Randow - Tomorrows Songs
Phenomena - Blind Faith - Vinyl Version
Robin Beck - Metal Hard Rock Box - 4 CD Compilation
Jerome Mazza - Outlaw Son
Jerome Mazza - Outlaw Son - Japanese Version
Tommy Steen - Nevermind
Ricky Martin -  - Spanish Compilation - 2018

2019
Tug Of War - Soulfire
Tug Of War - Soulfire - American Version
Jerome Mazza - Outlaw Son - American Version
Rainmaker - s/t - Remastered
Hollywood Vampires - Rise - Digipack
Hollywood Vampires - Rise - Double LP Black - European Version
Hollywood Vampires - Rise - Double LP Black - USA Version
Hollywood Vampires - Rise - Limited Glow In The Dark Coloured Double LP
Hollywood Vampires - Rise - Limited Orange & Red Coloured Double LP
Hollywood Vampires - Rise - Boxset
Hollywood Vampires - Rise - USA & Canada Version
Hollywood Vampires - Rise - Russian Version
Hollywood Vampires - Rise - Brazilian Version
Hollywood Vampires - Rise - Australian Version
Hollywood Vampires - Rise - Japanese Version
Hollywood Vampires - Rise - Japanese Special 3 CD Version
Marty & The Bad Punch - Walk A Straight Line
Marty & The Bad Punch - Walk A Straight Line - Vinyl Version
Tony Mills - Beyond The Law
Tony Mills - Beyond The Law - Japanese Version
Tony Mills - Beyond The Law - Russian Version
Janina Jade - No Sweet Illusions
Janina Jade - No Sweet Illusions - Sliptrick Version
Dansbands Country - Volym 2
Joey Summer - OBFP
AOR - Heavenly Demos
Perrish Records - Various
Hollywood Hairspray - Vol 8
Hollywood Monsters - Thriving On Chaos

2020
Deep Purple - Infinite (reissue) double vinyl
Tommy Steen - Silveralbum
Robert Hart - Pure
Robert Hart - Pure - Vinyl version
Tommy Denander - Less Is More - Remaster 2020
Tommy Denander - Skeleton - Remaster 2020
Prisoner - Blind - Remaster 2020
Prisoner - II - Remaster 2020
Deacon Street - Remaster 2020
Deacon Street II - Remaster 2020
Speedy Gonzales - Electric Stalker - Remaster 2020
AOR - The Best Of The Westcoast Spirit
AOR - Next Stop: L.A. - Limited Edition
AOR - The Colors Of L.A - Limited Edition
Nils Patrik Johansson - The Great Conspiracy
Nils Patrik Johansson - The Great Conspiracy - Vinyl version
StoneFlower - Finally
Pinnacle Point - Symphony Of Mind
Outside The Flow - You're Burning My Halo
The Feckers - Live To Fight Another Day 
Stardust - Highway To Heartbreak
Stardust - Highway To Heartbreak - Japanese Version
Overland - Scandalous
Overland - Scandalous - Vinyl Version
Overland - Scandalous - Vinyl Ash Version
House Of Lords - New World
House Of Lords - New World - Japanese Version
House Of Lords - New World - Russian Version
House Of Lords - New World - Limited Orange Vinyl
House Of Lords - New World - Limited Purple Vinyl
Buffalo Rock City - Wester New York's Tribute To KISS

2021
Alice Cooper - Detroit Stories - European version
Alice Cooper - Detroit Stories - US version
Alice Cooper - Detroit Stories - Japanese version
Alice Cooper - Detroit Stories - Australian version
Alice Cooper - Detroit Stories - Russian version
Alice Cooper - Detroit Stories - Brazilian version
Alice Cooper - Detroit Stories - Limited box set - European version
Alice Cooper - Detroit Stories - Limited box set - US version
Alice Cooper - Detroit Stories - Limited box set - Russian version
Alice Cooper - Detroit Stories - Limited box set - Japanese version
Alice Cooper - Detroit Stories - Limited box set Blu-ray - European version
Alice Cooper - Detroit Stories - Vinyl version - Black
Alice Cooper - Detroit Stories - Vinyl version - Red
Alice Cooper - Detroit Stories - Vinyl version - Blue
Alice Cooper - Detroit Stories - Vinyl version - Clear
Alice Cooper - Detroit Stories - Vinyl version - White
Alice Cooper - Detroit Stories - Vinyl version - Good Records
Alice Cooper - Detroit Stories - Vinyl version - Numbered White US
Alice Cooper - Detroit Stories - Digipack
Alice Cooper - Detroit Stories - Jewel Case 
Alice Cooper - A Paranormal Evening At The Olympia Paris - DVD version
Alice Cooper - A Paranormal Evening At The Olympia Paris - Blu-ray version
Robbie LaBlanc - Double Trouble
Robin McAuley - Standing On The Edge
Robin McAuley - Standing On The Edge - Japanese Version
Robin McAuley - Standing On The Edge - Vinyl version
AOR - The Ghost Of L.A.
AOR - The Best Of Paul Sabu
Touch - Tomorrow Never Comes
Touch - Tomorrow Never Comes - Japanese Version
Paul Stanley - Live To Win - Limited edition gold vinyl
Paul Stanley - Live To Win - Limited edition white vinyl
Paul Stanley - Live To Win - Limited edition black vinyl
Edge B.S. - Heaven Still Knows - Remaster
EarMusic - Compilation
Glee - Love Songs
House of Lords - Saint Of The Lost Souls - Limited clear vinyl
House of Lords - Saint Of The Lost Souls - Limited blue vinyl

2022
Radioactive - X.X.X
Mecca - 20 Years - 3 CD Box
Bangalore Choir - All Or Nothing The Complete Studio Albums
Bangalore Choir - Beyond Target (Alternate mixes, rarities and demos)
Kaj Pousar - Nine Lives
Circle Of Friends - The Garden
Turkish Delight - Vol 1
Turkish Delight - Vol 1 - Vinyl Version
AOR - L.A. Suspicion
AOR - Journey To L.A.
Stages
Pearls & Flames - Reliance
House of Lords - Saints And Sinners
House of Lords - Saints And Sinners - Vinyl version
DÖD - Arising From The Ashes
Mountain Of Power - Vol Two - Digipack Reissue
Killer Kings - Burn For Love
Fireworks -Rock & Metal - Issue 100
Gabrielle De Val - Kiss In A Dragon Night
Glee - LGBTQIA+ Pride
Michael Bormann's Jaded Heart - Power To Win
The Retaliators - Movie Soundtrack
Fireworks - Issue 100 Compilation
Fireworks - Issue 101 Compilation
Alice Cooper - Alive In This Nightmare (Bootleg)
Alice Cooper & Ace Frehley - Ascend To Great Heights (Bootleg)
Alice Cooper - Paranormal Stories (Tripple vinyl box)
Alice Cooper - Paranormal "Limited picture vinyl"
Alice Cooper - A Paranormal Evening Live "Limited picture vinyl"
Alice Cooper - Detroit Stories "Limited picture vinyl"

2023
Crossbone Skully - Evil World Machine
Robin McAuley - Alive
Robin McAuley - Alive - Vinyl version
Khymera - Hold Your Ground
T3nors - Naked Soul
Battlegod Productions - 28th Anniversary Compilation
Mecca - Everlasting
Mecca - Everlasting - Vinyl version
Lee Small - The Last Man On Earth
Brunky Music - Ticket To Japan
Gabrielle De Val - Kiss In A Dragon Night
Gabrielle De Val - Kiss In A Dragon Night - Picture vinyl

Other recordings - Singles
Janne Berlin - Gröna Gubbar - 1984
Cheese - Won't Come Easy - 1986
Cool For Cats - Talking In Your Sleep - 1988
Rat Bat Blue - Saints & Sinners - 1989
Robin - Caribbean Partytime - 1990
17 - Easy Come/Easy Go - 1990
Dag Finn - I Wanna Be Your Boyfriend - 1990
Dag Finn - Bye Bye Baby Goodbye - 1990
Dag Finn - What Goes Around Will Come Around - 1990
Dag Finn - Big Time Shuffle "promo" - 1990
Dag Finn - Hej Gud - 1992
Q - I Want To Survive - 1993
Emma Andersson - I Believe  - 2000
Jessa Slatter - Angel - 2000
Deacoy - Allright - 2003
Ten 67 - Rock And Roll Allright - 2003
Mikael Erlandsson - Tills Jag Mötte Dig - 2003
Jim Jidhed - Full Circle - 2003
Jim Jidhed - I'll Be Ready Then - 2003
Schytts - Lite Mera Kärlek 2004
Christer Nerfont - Sköna Dagar - 2004
Spin Gallery - Am I Wrong - 2004
Iina feat Gary Revel - You Don't Need To Go - 2004
Radioactive - Stronger Than Yesterday - 2005
Schytts - En Dag, En Natt Med Dig 2005
Hero In Action - C'mon, C'mon, C'mon - 2005
Jill Johnson - Baby You're Mine - 2005
Fronda feat Stephen Simmonds - Du Betyder Ingenting - 2005
Sha-Boom - My Home Town - 2005
Jim Jidhed - För Alltid - 2006
Paul Stanley - Live To Win - CD promo
Paul Stanley - Live To Win - Vinyl promo
Paul Stanley - Live To Win - Vinyl
Paul Stanley - Live To Win - Vinyl Purple
Paul Stanley - Live To Win - CD
Cleo - Add A Little Love - 2007
Javiera - Frozen Flower - 2007
Barbados - Stanna Här Hos Mig - 2007
Williams-Friestedt - One More Night - 2008
Williams-Friestedt - Swear Your Love - 2008
Frozen Rain -  Sailor On Dry Land - 2008
Kindbergs - Ner Till Södern
Ebbe - Piggar Upp - 2009
Tigermom - Save A Little Lovin - 2009
Tigermom - Embrace Us - 2009
Star Pilots - Higher - 2009 (GOLD)
Star Pilots - I'm Alive - 2009
Hansen-Randow - Stay - 2009
Hansen-Randow - Frustrated - 2009
Hansen-Randow - Sommerregn - 2009
Hansen-Randow - I'm Burnin - 2009
Hansen-Randow - Forever Until The End - 2009
Hansen-Randow - October - 2009
Xlnt Marc - Best In Show - 2009
Robin Beck - Lost Summer Days - 2009
Kim - Here Comes The Night - 2009
Ricky Martin - Más - 2010 "Mexico" (GOLD)
Ricky Martin - Más - 2010 "Digital" (GOLD & PLATINUM)
Play - Famous/Girls - 2010
Play - Famous + Remixes - 2010
Björn Skifs - I'm Here To Stay - 2010
Meja - Dance With Somebody - 2010
Star Pilots - Heaven Can Wait - 2010
Hansen-Randow - Light Of Darkness - 2010
Denise Lopez - Girls & Rock And Roll - 2010
Erik Gadd - Release Me (P3 Guld) - 2010
Richard Herrey - Hurtful (P3 Guld) - 2010
Jake Samuel - Svennebanan (P3 Guld) - 2010
Lena Philipsson - Hela Livet Var Ett Disco (P3 Guld) - 2010
IDOL - All I Need Is You - 2010 (GOLD & PLATINUM)
Hansen - Randow - Light Of Darkness - 2010
Ebbe - Tja la la Djurgården - 2010
Hansen - Randow - Lost - 2011
Play - Famous + remix - Dutch Version - 2011
Big Time Rush - Famous - 2011 (GOLD & PLATINUM)
Big Time Rush - Til I Forget About You/Famous - 2011
Williams - Friestedt - Say Goodbye -2011
Camilla Brinck - Breaking Unplugged - 2011
Anders Fernette - Run - 2011
Meja - When You Wish Upon A Star - 2011
Michael J Scott - Coming Home - 2011
Houston - "Don't You Know What Love Is" - Single
Glee - Some Nights - 2012 (GOLD & PLATINUM)
Glee - Roots Before Bransches - 2012 (GOLD)
Glee - It's All Coming Back To Me Now - 2012 (GOLD)
Glee - Paradise By The Dashboard Light (GOLD)
Glee - Never Say Never - 2012
Glee - Don't Speak - 2012
Fiona - Loved Along The Way - 2012
Kevin & Michel - Jag älskar dig - 2012
Hansen - Randow - Driving From Zero - 2013
Hansen - Randow - Du Vet Hvor Jeg Er - 2013
Close Quarters - Let's Put A Smile On That Face - 2013
Kings In Exile - Going Under - 2013
Rachele Royale - Shush - 2013
Houston - Runaway - 2013
Houston - I'm Coming Home - 2013
Rachele Royale - R U Chicken - 2014
Rachele Royale - Unscrew U - 2014
Ludvig Turner - 1000 Mph - 2014
Angela Mukul - I'd Rather Be Single - 2014
Hoggez Orkester - Dangerous - 2014
Let's Dance - All Stars - 2014
Outtrigger - Echo - 2014 (GOLD)
Outtrigger - Awaken Me - 2015
Outtrigger - Superman Is Dead - 2014
Smith & Tell - Hippe Van - 2014
Benjamin Wahlgren & The Let's Dance Crew - Let's Dance - 2014
Anne-Marie Bush - Fly - 2014
Vic Heart - Jimmy Dean - 2014
Kaj Pousar & Tone Norum - Egen Staty - 2014
Tony Mills - Girls In Norway - 2014
Pussel - Ny Nivå - 2014
Impulsia - Hallelujah - 2015
Behrang Miri feat V Crone - Det Rår Jag Inte För - 2015
Hansen-Randow - If I Knew - 2015
Wonnmass - Scream - 2015
Wonnmass - Demons - 2015
Matz Lindell - Keep it 2 Myself - 2015
Benjamin Ingrosso - Crystal Clear - 2015
Impulsia - Josephine - 2016
Alex Shield - New York City Ways - 2016
Kaj Pousar - Glad Att Det Är Över - 2016
Oscar Zia - Human - 2016 (GOLD & X2 PLATINUM)
Alex Shield - New York City Ways - 2016
Eric Grensner - Spirits - 2016
Eric Grensner - Hope - 2017
Eric Grensner - Lights - 2017
Umberto Tozzi & Anastacia - Ti Amo - 2017
Alex Shield - The Good Fight - 2017
Alex Shield - The Good Fight (remix feat Per Gessle) - 2017
Tommy Denander - Heartstrings - 2017
Ronander - Flow - 2017
Ace Wilder - Dansa I Neon - 2017
Tayo Hendrix - We Shall Overcome - 2017
Robin Beck - Love Is Coming - 2017
Alice Cooper - Paranoiac Personality - 2017
Alice Cooper - Paranormal - 2017
Hansen-Randow - Burning House - 2017
Eric Grensner - Attitudes - 2017
Eric Grensner - Harmonies - 2018
Alice Cooper - The Sound Of A - 2018
Hansen-Randow - Monkey Man - 2018
Alex Shield - Beautiful Strangers - 2018
The Emotional Rex - Can't Let It Show - 2018
Tommy Denander - Dreamland - 2018
Tommy Denander Featuring Hollie - Twinkle Twinkle Little Star - 2018
Ninna & Kickan - Varje Gång Jag Ser Dig - 2018
Ninna & Kickan - Take On Me - 2018
Brunkymusic - Live It Up - 2018
Brunkymusic - Live It Up - Vinyl Version - 2018
Henning Hallqvist - Time Keeper - 2018
Steve Walsh featuring Steve Overland - Warzaw - 2018
Jussanam - Je paierai pour voir - 2019
Jussanam - Você vem ou não? - 2019
Pierre Åström - Twenty Years From Now - 2019
Marty & The Bad Punch - Zakopane - 2019
Chiefgroover & Co - Shooting Star - 2019
Bright Shining Light - Crack The Code - 2019
Alex Labao - Somewhere Tonight - 2019
Patricia Hill - I Know What I Want - 2019
Linda Wallin - Starkare Än Du - 2019
Tommy Denander - Silent Night - 2019
Brunkymusic - Moments Of LA - 2019
Hansen-Randow - Out Of Blue Comes Green - 2020
Bright Shining Light - Save Me - 2020
Bright Shinging Light - Love Bites (So Do I) - 2020
Bright Shinging Light - Build Back Better - 2020
Bright Shinging Light - So Hauntingly Beautiful - 2020
Bright Shinging Light - It Takes One To Know One - 2020
Bright Shinging Light - I Can't Stop Singing About You - 2020
Bright Shinging Light - Change Our Ways - 2020
Bright Shinging Light - Such A Beautiful Thing - 2020
Bright Shinging Light - The Devil In Me - 2020
Turkish Delight - Frozen Rose - 2020
Turkish delight - The Year 2000 - 2020
Kaj Pousar - Min Hemstad - 2020
Stardust - Runaway - 2020
Jonas Elgquist - When Timing Is Right - 2020
Marty And The Bad Punch Feat Robert Tepper - Better Be Strong - 2021
Guitars Against COVID-19 - Synchronicity II "The Quarantine Version" - 2020
Bright Shining Light - Make You Wonder - 2021
Jimmy Nordstrand - 5 Minuter Och 25 Sekunder Om Ett Helt År - 2021
Jimmy Nordstrand - Sista Raderna Om Oss - 2021
Bright Shining Light - Back To Hell Again - 2021
Outside The Flow - Woke Up In Hell - 2021
Outside The Flow - Blood And Thunder - 2021
Hansen - Randow - Frustrated (Antiquasar Remix) - 2021
Bright Shining Light - The Way It Went Down - 2021
Bright Shining Light - Something That You Need To Know - 2021
Bulsara - No Gravity - 2021
DC Band - Benjamin Ingrosso - 2021
Radioactive - Monkey On Our Backs - 2022
Radioactive - Move It - 2022
Radioactive - Written In The Scars - 2022
Jimmy Nordstrand - Ett Enkelt Liv - 2022
Outside The Flow feat Maverick - The Cost Of Fire - 2022
Outside The Flow - Into The Unknown - 2022
Outside The Flow - Smile Enjoy The Ride - 2022
Kym Redmond - What's Left Behind - 2022
John Conlin - Hopeful Romantic - 2022
Hansen-Randow - Det Snör - 2022
Lion's Share - Run For Your Life - 2022
Pete Lowe - Do You Wanna Write A Song With Me
Johan Kihlberg's Impera - The Empire Strikes Back (Medley) - 2022
Crossbone Skully - Evil World Machine - 2022
Crossbone Skully - The Boom Went The Boom - 2023

Soundtracks, TV series and DVDs 
The Retaliators
Anastasia - Once Upon A Time
Gorillas In The Mist (Sigourney Weaver)
Alice In Wonderland (Johnny Depp)
Baltic Storm (Donald Sutherland)
South Park - Episode 1
Mitch Malloy - Live at Firefest
Jimi Jamison - Live At Firefest
Dan Reed - Live at Union Chapel
The Rasmus
90's Reloaded
Melodifestivalen 2003 (GOLD)
Melodifestivalen 2009
Melodifestivalen 2010
Melodifestivalen Karaoke 2010
Melodi Grand Prix Norway 2005
Big Hit Final
United
På Scen Live
Radioactive Taken DVD - 2005
Lightyears Away
Living Life
Downhill
Candlemass - The Curse Of Candlemass
Big Time Rush - Season 1
Big Time Rush - Season 2
Glee - The Complete Season 1-3
Glee - The Complete Season 1-3 Yearbook Edition
Glee - The Complete Edition
Glee - The Complete Season Four
Glee - Season Three
Glee - The Complete Edition 1-4
Per Albinsson - Att Dansa Med Vinden
Baranga Film - Show reel
Malmberg Media - Show Reel
Radioactive - Ceremony Of Documents
Elin Sundell - Vodaphone
Mag2 - Vol 4
Anne Marie Bush - Supasexual
Horny Strings - Best Of Live Vol 1 - bootleg
Horny Strings - Best Of Live Vol 2 - bootleg
ATC - Live At Gröna Lund 1985 - bootleg
Prisoner - Live Zrock 2001 - bootleg
Karaoke - Vol 1
Karaoke - Vol 2
Karaoke - Vol 3
Karaoke - Vol 4
Karaoke - Vol 5
Aktuellt Rapport - Home videos vol 2
Aktuellt Rapport - Home videos vol 3
Aktuellt Rapport - Home videos vol 4
Aktuellt Rapport - Home videos vol 5

References

External links
Official website

Living people
1968 births
Swedish guitarists
Male guitarists
Swedish record producers
Swedish songwriters
Frontiers Records artists
Swedish male musicians